Fauzia is a given name. Notable people with the name include:

Fauzia Gailani, elected to represent Herat Province in Afghanistan's Wolesi Jirga, the lower house of its National Legislature, in 2005
Fauzia Wahab, Pakistani politician in the Pakistan Peoples Party (PPP)
Reenat Fauzia, sitarist, daughter of Mobarak Hossain Khan, a musicologist and litterateur